The National Standards of the People's Republic of China, coded as , are the standards issued by the Standardization Administration of China under the authorization of Article 10 of the Standardization Law of the People's Republic of China. 

According to Article 2, national standards are divided into mandatory national standards and recommended national standards. Mandatory national standards are prefixed "GB". Recommended national standards are prefixed "". Guidance technical documents are prefixed with "GB/Z", but are not legally part of the national standard system.

Mandatory national standards are the basis for the product testing which products must undergo during the China Compulsory Certificate (CCC or 3C) certification. If there is no corresponding mandatory national standard, CCC is not required.

List

A non-exhaustive list of National Standards of the People's Republic of China is listed as follows, accompanied with similar international standards of ISO, marked as identical (IDT), equivalent (EQV), or non-equivalent (NEQ). Copies of standards (written in simplified Chinese) may be obtained from the SPC web store.

Changes are made frequently within the regulatory system of Chinese GB Standards. New standards are released, existing standards are changed or updated.

See also 
 GOST
 China Compulsory Certificate (CCC or 3C)
 China Food and Drug Administration
 Chinese National Standards, used in the Republic of China
 Vietnam Standards
 Other meanings of Guóbiāo:
 Guójì Biāozhǔn Wǔ (International Standard Dancesport)
 Guóbiāo Májiàng (National Standard Mahjong)

References

External links 
 
 
 
 

 
Certification marks
Product certification